Richard Gregory Phillips Sr. (August 24, 1940 – May 31, 2013) was an American lawyer. From 1978 to 2000, he was general counsel and executive director of the Major League Umpires Association (MLUA). He held a similar position for National Basketball Association (NBA) referees. Phillips is notable for recommending that Major League Baseball (MLB) umpires resign en masse in 1999.

Biography
Phillips, the son of a police officer, was born in August 1940 in Philadelphia. He graduated from St. Thomas More High School and received both his undergraduate and law degrees from Villanova University. While in college, he played varsity football and later returned to coach the freshman football team while attending law school. After getting his legal degree in 1966, Phillips worked for one-and-a-half years in the Philadelphia public defender's office. From there, he moved to the district attorney's office as a trial assistant in the organized crime division, and on to the homicide division until around 1971.

Phillips' law office was located in Bala Cynwyd, Pennsylvania. He represented the Transport Workers Union and handled legal matters for the top brass of the Carpenters Union. He also represented about 30 athletes, which he maintained did not present any conflict of interest with his duties relating to sports officials.

In 1996, Phillips became the majority owner of Pilot Freight Services, based in Lima, Pennsylvania. At the time, Pilot Freight was struggling to stay afloat in a sea full of transportation providers. Phillips was able to lead the company to the top of the industry, and by the time he stepped away from day-to-day management of the company, Pilot Freight Services was the largest privately held freight forwarder in the United States. In 2007, Phillips' son Richard Jr. became CEO of the company.

Phillips served as general counsel and executive director of the Major League Umpires Association (MLUA). He recommended that Major League Baseball umpires resign en masse effective September 2, 1999, seeking enhanced benefits for union umpires. This decision ultimately turned out to be devastating to the umpires, as Major League Baseball accepted many of the resignations, terminating their employment and promoting replacement umpires from the minor leagues. The umpires later voted to decertify the union, replacing it with the World Umpires Association.

In 1964, Phillips married Ellen Harrell; they had two sons and two daughters. He died of cardiac arrest at his home in Cape May, New Jersey, at age 72 in May 2013.

References

Further reading
CNN/SI: "Richie's Gang" – 1999 article by Frank Deford
CNN/SI: "Not even close" – 1999 article on dissolution of MLUA
Doug Pappas, "22 Men Out", Society for American Baseball Research – 1999 analysis of the umpires' ill-fated mass resignation
Referee magazine – 1979 interview
Referee magazine: "Hindsight and History"

External links

1940 births
2013 deaths
American trade union leaders
Major League Baseball executives
People from Cape May, New Jersey
Lawyers from Philadelphia
Pennsylvania lawyers
Villanova Wildcats football players
Villanova University School of Law alumni
20th-century American lawyers